The 2007 Mississippi State Bulldogs baseball team placed 2nd in the SEC WEST and reached the 2007 College World Series.

Ron Polk was the coach of the Bulldogs, in his 28th year.

Regular season
The Bulldogs finished the regular season with a 33-18 record, and 15-13 SEC record.  The team started strong, but finished weakly thanks to injuries to starting SS Brandon Turner and OF Jeff Flagg.

SEC Tournament
The Bulldogs went 0-2 in the tournament, while facing aces Will Kline and David Price, of Ole Miss and Vanderbilt, respectively.  It was the only time in 24 total appearances that a Ron Polk coached team went winless in the SEC Baseball Tournament.

NCAA tournament
The Bulldogs were the 2 seed in the Tallahassee Regional, hosted by Florida State, and after defeating Stetson, upset Florida State twice.  When Clemson, also a 2 seed, won the corresponding Myrtle Beach Regional, hosted by Coastal Carolina University,  Mississippi State was selected to host the Super Regional.  The Bulldogs defeated the Tigers in two games by scores of 8-6 and 8-5, with each game setting NCAA records for Super Regional attendance, and qualified for the College World Series.

College World Series
The Bulldogs lost twice in the College World Series, to North Carolina and Louisville.

Roster and Stats

Players

Pitchers

These players were on the roster, but did not appear in any games and redshirted.

Schedule and results

|- align="center" bgcolor="#bbffbb"
| 1 || February 23 || Murray State || 10-5 || Dudy Noble Field || Weatherford (1-0) || Donze || Crosswhite (1) || 6063 || 1-0 || 
|- align="center" bgcolor="#bbffbb"
| 2 || February 24 || Murray State || 13-1 || Dudy Noble Field || Pigott (1-0) || Rowland || --- || 6045 || 2-0 || 
|- align="center" bgcolor="#bbffbb"
| 3 || February 25 || Murray State || 17-9 || Dudy Noble Field || Bowen (1-0) || McGaha || --- || 6263 || 3-0 || 
|- align="center" bgcolor="#bbffbb"
| 4 || February 27 || Mississippi Valley St. || 13-2 || Dudy Noble Field || Whitney (1-0) || Casias || --- || 6322 || 4-0 || 
|- align="center" bgcolor="#bbffbb"
| 5 || March 2 || Troy || 2-1 || Dudy Noble Field || Weatherford (2-0) || Snipes || Crosswhite (2) || 6451 || 5-0 || 
|- align="center" bgcolor="#ffbbbb"
| 6 || March 3 || Michigan || 3-4 || Dudy Noble Field || Putnam || Pigott (0-1) || Jenzen || 7272 || 5-1 || 
|- align="center" bgcolor="#bbffbb"
| 7 || March 4 || Troy || 12-4 || Dudy Noble Field || Johnson (1-0) || Green || --- || 6363 || 6-1 || 
|- align="center" bgcolor="#bbffbb"
| 8 || March 6 || UAB || 12-10 || Dudy Noble Field || Crosswhite (1-0) || Jones || --- || 5989 || 7-1 || 
|- align="center" bgcolor="#bbffbb"
| 9 || March 7 || Jacksonville State || 11-9 || Dudy Noble Field || Lalor (1-0) || Clements || Bowen (1) || 6123 || 8-1 || 
|- align="center" bgcolor="#ffbbbb"
| 10 || March 9 || vs. Winthrop || 6-7 || Baylor Ballpark || Mullins || Crosswhite (1-1) || Franzblau || 2781 || 8-2 || 
|- align="center" bgcolor="#bbffbb"
| 11 || March 10 || at Baylor || 8-6 || Baylor Ballpark || Pigott (2-1) || Matthews || Houston (1) || 3290 || 9-2 || 
|- align="center" bgcolor="#bbffbb"
| 12 || March 11 || vs. San Francisco || 2-1 || Baylor Ballpark || Johnson (2-0) || Dufloth || Bowen (2) || 3060 || 10-2 || 
|- align="center"
| || March 13 || at Texas-Arlington || colspan="8"| Rained out
|- align="center" bgcolor="#ffbbbb"
| 13 || March 14 || at Dallas Baptist || 8-11 || Patriot Field || Goins || Whitney (1-1) || --- || 500 || 10-3 || 
|- align="center" bgcolor="#bbffbb"
| 14 || March 16 || at Florida || 12-9 || McKethan Stadium || Weatherford (3-0) || Porter || Lalor (1) || 3281 || 11-3 || 1-0 
|- align="center" bgcolor="#ffbbbb"
| 15 || March 17 || at Florida || 8-10 || McKethan Stadium || Locke || Pigott (2-2) || Porter || 3151 || 11-4 || 1-1 
|- align="center" bgcolor="#bbffbb"
| 16 || March 18 || at Florida || 14-13 || McKethan Stadium || Crosswhite (2-1) || Keating || Moreland (1) || 3316 || 12-4 || 2-1 
|- align="center" bgcolor="#bbffbb"
| 17 || March 21 || Samford || 7-6 || Dudy Noble Field || Moreland (1-0) || Edens || --- || 1837 || 13-4 || 
|- align="center" bgcolor="#ffbbbb"
| 18 || March 23 || South Carolina || 3-20 || Dudy Noble Field || Honeycutt || Weatherford (3-1) || --- || 6529 || 13-5 || 2-2 
|- align="center" bgcolor="#bbffbb"
| 19 || March 24 || South Carolina || 6-5 || Dudy Noble Field || Bowen (2-0) || Johnson || --- || 6340 || 14-5 || 3-2 
|- align="center" bgcolor="#ffbbbb"
| 20 || March 25 || South Carolina || 3-8 || Dudy Noble Field || Jeffords || Johnson (2-1) || --- || 6145 || 14-6 || 3-3 
|- align="center" bgcolor="#bbffbb"
| 21 || March 27 || Memphis || 9-8 || Dudy Noble Field || Bowen (3-0) || Davis || --- || 5662 || 15-6 || 
|- align="center" bgcolor="#bbffbb"
| 22 || March 28 || Memphis || 11-9 || Dudy Noble Field || Lalor (2-0) || Cupples || Bowen (3) || 6075 || 16-6 || 
|- align="center" bgcolor="#bbffbb"
| 23 || March 30 || Kentucky || 10-7 || Dudy Noble Field || Houston (1-0) || Henry || Bowen (4) || 8383 || 17-6 || 4-3 
|- align="center" bgcolor="#ffbbbb"
| 24 || March 31 || Kentucky || 6-10 || Dudy Noble Field || Albers || Pigott (2-3) || Lovett || 10324 || 17-7 || 4-4 
|- align="center" bgcolor="#bbffbb"
| 25 || April 1 || Kentucky || 5-4 || Dudy Noble Field || Moreland (2-0) || Ragle || --- || 6307 || 18-7 || 5-4 
|- align="center" bgcolor="#bbffbb"
| 26 || April 3 || Louisiana-Monroe || 17-7 || Dudy Noble Field || Whitney (2-1) || Soignier || --- || 5951 || 19-7 || 
|- align="center" bgcolor="#bbffbb"
| 27 || April 6 || at Arkansas || 11-9 || Baum Stadium || Crosswhite (3-1) || Keuchel || --- || 7394 || 20-7 || 6-4 
|- align="center" bgcolor="#bbffbb"
| 28 || April 7 || at Arkansas || 2-1 || Baum Stadium || Pigott (3-3) || Welker || --- || 7712 || 21-7 || 7-4 
|- align="center" bgcolor="#ffbbbb"
| 29 || April 8 || at Arkansas || 3-9 || Baum Stadium || Schmidt || Johnson (2-0) || --- || 7004 || 21-8 || 7-5 
|- align="center"
| || April 10 || at South Alabama ||colspan="8"| Rained out
|- align="center" bgcolor="#bbffbb"
| 30 || April 11 || South Alabama || 5-1 || Trustmark Park || Whitney (3-1) || Turner || --- || 3370 || 22-8 || 
|- align="center" bgcolor="#bbffbb"
| 31 || April 13 || at Tennessee || 4-3 || Lindsey Nelson Stadium || Crosswhite (2-1) || Adkins || Weatherford (1) || 2169 || 23-8 || 8-5 
|- align="center"
| || April 14 || at Tennessee || colspan="8"| Rained out
|- align="center"
| || April 15 || at Tennessee || colspan="8"| Rained out
|- align="center" bgcolor="#bbffbb"
| 32 || April 17 || Ole Miss || 14-9 || Trustmark Park || Whitney (4-1) || Simpson || --- || 8012 || 24-8 || 
|- align="center" bgcolor="#bbffbb"
| 33 || April 20 || LSU || 12-3 || Dudy Noble Field || Crosswhite (5-1) || Furbush || --- || 7283 || 25-8 || 9-5 
|- align="center" bgcolor="#ffbbbb"
| 34 || April 21 || LSU || 5-6 || Dudy Noble Field || Forrest || Bowen (3-1) || Bradford || 8006 || 25-9 || 9-6 
|- align="center" bgcolor="#ffbbbb"
| 35 || April 22 || LSU || 1-3 || Dudy Noble Field || Bradford || Weatherford (3-2) || Bertuccini || 6736 || 25-10 || 9-7 
|- align="center" bgcolor="#bbffbb"
| 36 || April 24 || Southern Miss || 11-2 || Dudy Noble Field || Whitney (5-1) || Cavenaugh || Lalor (2) || 6361 || 26-10 || 
|- align="center" bgcolor="#bbffbb"
| 37 || April 25 || Southern Miss || 7-4 || Dudy Noble Field || Bowen (4-1) || Cashion || Weatherford (2) || 5802 || 27-10 || 
|- align="center" bgcolor="#ffbbbb"
| 38 || April 27 || at Ole Miss || 7-17 || Swayze Field || Bukvich || Crosswhite (5-2) || --- || 7638 || 27-11 || 9-8 
|- align="center" bgcolor="#ffbbbb"
| 39 || April 28 || at Ole Miss || 1-5 || Swayze Field || Lynn || Pigott (3-4) || --- || 7312 || 27-12 || 9-9 
|- align="center" bgcolor="#bbffbb"
| 40 || April 29 || at Ole Miss || 4-1 || Swayze Field || Moreland (3-0) || Bittle || --- || 7087 || 28-12 || 10-9 
|- align="center" bgcolor="#bbffbb"
| 41 || May 4 || Auburn || 4-1 || Dudy Noble Field || Crosswhite (6-2) || Crawford || Weatherford (3) || 6534 || 29-12 || 11-9 
|- align="center" bgcolor="#bbffbb"
| 42 || May 5 || Auburn || 11-6 || Dudy Noble Field || Pigott (4-4) || Thompson || --- || 6980 || 30-12 || 12-9 
|- align="center" bgcolor="#bbffbb"
| 43 || May 6 || Auburn || 9-5 || Dudy Noble Field || Bowen (5-1) || Butts || --- || 6371 || 31-12 || 13-9 
|- align="center" bgcolor="#ffbbbb"
| 44 || May 8 || at Austin Peay || 2-3 || Raymond C. Hand Park || Kole || Lalor (2-1) || --- || 601 || 31-13 || 
|- align="center" bgcolor="#ffbbbb"
| 45 || May 9 || at Austin Peay || 5-7 || Raymond C. Hand Park || Lykins || Houston (1-1) || Kole || 662 || 31-14 || 
|- align="center" bgcolor="#bbffbb"
| 46 || May 11 || at Georgia || 4-2 || Foley Field || Crosswhite (7-2) || Dodson || Lalor (3) || 1412 || 32-14 || 14-9 
|- align="center" bgcolor="#ffbbbb"
| 47 || May 13 || at Georgia || 1-2 || Foley Field || Moreau || Pigott (4-5) || Fields || 1325 || 32-15 || 14-10 
|- align="center" bgcolor="#ffbbbb"
| 48 || May 13 || at Georgia || 3-5 || Foley Field || Holder || Bowen (5-2) || Fields || 1325 || 32-16 || 14-11 
|- align="center"
| || May 15 || Arkansas-Little Rock || colspan="8"| Rained out
|- align="center" bgcolor="#ffbbbb"
| 49 || May 17 || Alabama || 3-4 || Dudy Noble Field || Hunter || Crosswhite (7-3) || --- || 6267 || 32-17 || 14-12 
|- align="center" bgcolor="#bbffbb"
| 50 || May 18 || Alabama || 9-3 || Dudy Noble Field || Pigott (5-5) || Quigley || --- || 6972 || 33-17 || 15-12 
|- align="center" bgcolor="#ffbbbb"
| 51 || May 19 || Alabama || 7-9 || Dudy Noble Field || Stroup || Johnson (2-3) || Hyatt || 7181 || 33-18 || 15-13 
|-

|- align="center" bgcolor="#ffbbbb"
| 52 || May 23 || Ole Miss || 1-3 || Regions Park || Kline || Pigott (5-6) || --- || 6192 || 33-19   
|- align="center" bgcolor="#ffbbbb"
| 53 ||  May 24 || Vanderbilt || 2-3 || Regions Park || Price || Crosswhite (7-4) || --- || 5782 || 33-20
|-

|- align="center" bgcolor="#bbffbb"
| 54 || June 1 || Stetson || 6-3 || Dick Howser Stadium || Crosswhite (8-4) || Ingoglia || Bowen (5) || 2701 || 34-20
|- align="center" bgcolor="#bbffbb"
| 55 || June 2 || Florida State || 3-0 || Dick Howser Stadium || Pigott (6-6) || Henry || Weatherford (4) || 4088 || 35-20
|- align="center" bgcolor="#bbffbb"
| 56 || June 3 || Florida State || 9-4 || Dick Howser Stadium || Johnson (3-3) || Rosen || --- || 3714 || 36-20
|-

|- align="center" bgcolor="#bbffbb"
| 57 || June 8 || Clemson || 8-6 || Dudy Noble Field || Lalor (3-1) || Moskos || Weatherford (5) || 12620 || 37-20
|- align="center" bgcolor="#bbffbb"
| 58 || June 9 || Clemson || 8-5 || Dudy Noble Field || Pigott (7-6) || Kopp || Moreland (2) || 13715 || 38-20
|-

|- align="center" bgcolor="#ffbbbb"
| 59 || June 15 || North Carolina || 5-8 || Rosenblatt Stadium || Warren || Pigott (7-7) || Carignan || 23568 || 38-21
|- align="center" bgcolor="#ffbbbb"
| 60 || June 17 || Louisville || 4-12 || Rosenblatt Stadium || Marks || Crosswhite (8-5) || --- || 18187 || 38-22
|-

See also
Mississippi State Bulldogs
Mississippi State Bulldogs baseball

References

External links
2007 Official Stats

Mississippi State Bulldogs baseball seasons
Mississippi State
College World Series seasons
Miss
Mississippi State